Song Jae-ho (born February 19, 1990) is a South Korean right-handed épée fencer and 2021 team Olympic bronze medalist.

Medal Record

Olympic Games

Asian Championship

World Cup

References

1990 births
Living people
South Korean male épée fencers
South Korean épée fencers
Olympic fencers of South Korea
Fencers at the 2020 Summer Olympics
Olympic medalists in fencing
Olympic bronze medalists for South Korea
Medalists at the 2020 Summer Olympics